Pari is a village in Salon block of Rae Bareli district, Uttar Pradesh, India. It is located 27 km from Raebareli, the district headquarters. As of 2011, Pari has a population of 7,060 people, in 1,283 households. It has one primary school and one maternity and child welfare centre, as well as a post office, an Anganwadi centre, and an agricultural credit society. The village hosts a market twice per week, on Mondays and Fridays; grain and vegetables are the main items traded.

The 1961 census recorded Pari as comprising 12 hamlets, with a total population of 2,991 people (1,488 male and 1,503 female), in 645 households and 598 physical houses. The area of the village was given as 1,901 acres and it had a post office at that point. Average attendance of the twice-weekly market was about 75 people then.

The 1981 census recorded Pari as having a population of 3,952 people, in 972 households, and having an area of 769.32 hectares. The main staple foods were given as wheat and rice.

References

Villages in Raebareli district